is a former Japanese football player.

Playing career
Higashi was born in Nara on August 23, 1978. After graduating from Tenri University, he joined J2 League club Sagan Tosu in 2001. He played many matches as midfielder in first season. However he could not play at all in the match in 2002 season and resigned with the club in July 2002. In 2008, he joined his local club Nara Club in Prefectural Leagues. He played many matches and the club was promoted to Regional Leagues from 2009. He retired end of 2010 season.

Club statistics

References

External links

1978 births
Living people
Tenri University alumni
Association football people from Nara Prefecture
Japanese footballers
J2 League players
Sagan Tosu players
Nara Club players
Association football midfielders